Daphu  is a town in Chukha District in southwestern Bhutan.

At the 2005 census, its population was 1,666.

References

External links 
Satellite map at Maplandia.com

Populated places in Bhutan